Hope Island is a privately owned island in Casco Bay near the city of Portland, Maine, United States. It is a part of the Town of Chebeague Island, in Cumberland County. The  island was considered for an LNG terminal. Developer John Cacoulidis and his wife Phyllis bought the island in 1993. In addition to the existing 10,000 sq. ft. house  built in 1913  with nine bedrooms, seven bathrooms and five fireplaces, the Cacoulidises built there  a separate 3,300-square-foot guest house, a boathouse with an apartment, and roads looping the island. They've also erected horse stables, a chicken coop, a garage and their own church, and for access both a boat dock and a  helicopter pad. In a dispute over property taxes, the two part-time residents attempted but failed in a legislative effort to secede from the town of Cumberland.

See also
 List of islands of Maine

References

Islands of Cumberland County, Maine
Islands of Maine
Islands of Casco Bay
Private islands of Maine